Paratheresina papuana is a species of beetle in the family Cerambycidae, and the only species in the genus Paratheresina. It was described by Breuning in 1975.

References

Apomecynini
Beetles described in 1975
Monotypic beetle genera